Mapula Nomvula "Nomi" Kgoale (born 20 November 1995) is a South African soccer player who plays as a defender for Spanish Primera Federación club CD Parquesol and the South Africa women's national team.

College career
Kgoale attended the Lindsey Wilson College, the Tyler Junior College and the Louisiana Tech University, both in the United States.

International career
Kgoale represented South Africa at the 2010 FIFA U-17 Women's World Cup. She made her senior debut on 12 May 2019 in a 0–3 friendly loss to the United States.

References

External links
Nomvula Kgoale at BDFútbol

1995 births
Living people
People from Lepelle-Nkumpi Local Municipality
People from Polokwane
Soccer players from Limpopo
South African women's soccer players
Women's association football defenders
Women's association football midfielders
Lindsey Wilson Blue Raiders women's soccer players
Tyler Apaches women's soccer players
Louisiana Tech Lady Techsters soccer players
CP Cacereño players
Segunda Federación (women) players
South Africa women's international soccer players
South African expatriate soccer players
South African expatriate sportspeople in the United States
Expatriate women's soccer players in the United States
South African expatriate sportspeople in Spain
Expatriate women's footballers in Spain